Ian Stuart may refer to:

 Ian Stuart (cricketer) (born 1964), South African cricketer
 Ian Stuart, nom de plume of Scottish novelist Alistair MacLean (1922–1987)
 Ian Stuart Donaldson (1957–1993), English musician, singer and songwriter; sometimes known as Ian Stuart
 Ian Stuart (designer) (born 1967), British fashion designer
 Ian Stuart (bishop) (born 1942), bishop of the Anglican Church of Australia and the Church of England
 Ian Stuart (rugby union) (born 1961), Canadian rugby player

See also

Ian Stewart (disambiguation)